The 1937–38 season in Swedish football, starting August 1937 and ending July 1938:

Honours

Official titles

Competitions

Promotions, relegations and qualifications

Promotions

League transfers

Relegations

Domestic results

Allsvenskan 1937–38

Allsvenskan promotion play-off 1937–38

Division 2 Norra 1937–38

Division 2 Östra 1937–38

Division 2 Västra 1937–38

Division 2 Södra 1937–38

Division 2 promotion play-off 1937–38

Norrländska Mästerskapet 1938 
Final

National team results 

 Sweden: 

 Sweden: 

 Sweden: 

 Sweden: 

 Sweden: 

 Sweden: 

 Sweden: 

 Sweden: 

 Sweden: 

 Sweden:

National team players in season 1937–38

Notes

References 
Print

Online

 
Seasons in Swedish football